ODRP is a four-letter acronym that can refer to:

Office of the Defense Representative, Pakistan (United States Department of Defense)
Ontario Deposit Return Program